Spurge olive is a common name for several plants and may refer to:

Cneorum tricoccon
Species in the genus Daphne, particularly:
Daphne mezereum